Indigenous police services in Canada are police forces under the control of a First Nation or Inuit government. The power of Indigenous governments to establish independent police services varies, and only First Nations and Inuit communities governed by the Indian Act can establish their own police forces. Métis governments, First Nations, and Inuit governments that have completed the comprehensive land claims process can only contract police services to a third party police force. The powers of Indigenous police services also vary, and some cannot complete criminal investigations without outside consultation or maintain specialized resources, such as police dogs or crime labs.

History
The policing of Indigenous communities in Canada has long been fraught with racial tension, inequitable police service delivery, and the enforcement of colonial laws and practices. During the federal government's imposition of municipal-style elected councils on First Nations, the Royal Canadian Mounted Police raided the government buildings of traditional Indigenous hereditary chief's councils and oversaw the subsequent council elections — the Six Nations of the Grand River Elected Council was originally referred to as the "Mounties Council." The RCMP was also involved in enforcing Canada's residential school system — a system that sought to assimilate Indigenous children into Euro-Canadian culture and was later found to have amounted to cultural genocide — by serving as truant officers, citing parents who refused to allow their children attend residential schools, and routinely assisting Indian agents in bringing children to the schools, sometimes by force. During the Gustafsen Lake standoff in 1995, an RCMP commander reportedly told a subordinate to kill a prominent Indigenous demonstrator and "smear the prick and everyone with him," and an RCMP media liaison officer was quoted as saying that "smear campaigns are [the RCMP's] specialty." That same year, an Ontario Provincial Police sniper shot and killed an unarmed Indigenous activist, Dudley George, during the Ipperwash Crisis. Between 1990 and 2000, officers of the Saskatoon Police Service took at least four Indigenous people for wintertime "starlight tours," which involved driving drunk or disorderly Indigenous people to Corman Park or distant industrial areas and abandoning them there without suitable clothing.

In 1979, after the killing of stick-holding Mohawk steelworker David Cross by officers of the Sûreté du Québec, the Kahnawake Mohawk Nation established the Kahnawake Peacekeepers, which is the only Indigenous police service in North America composed entirely of Indigenous staff.

Beginning in the 1960s, the federal government began to withdraw RCMP officers from reserves in the provinces of Ontario and Quebec in favour of provincial control over First Nations policing. At the same time, individual First Nations began to establish self-administered police services, employ non-sworn "band constables" to assist police, or participate in special constabulary programs that facilitated the hiring of Indigenous police officers, creating a decentralized and inequitable patchwork of police service delivery across Canadian First Nations. In response, the federal government created the First Nations Policing Program in 1992, which scholars have called the first "comprehensive national policing strategy for its Aboriginal peoples." The Program was designed to allow First Nations and Inuit communities to create their own police forces that met the provincial standards for non-Indigenous police services, or establish their own RCMP detachment staffed by Indigenous officers, but has been criticized as underfunded and discriminatory by Indigenous groups, police chiefs, and the Canadian Human Rights Tribunal.

In 1993, the First Nations Chiefs of Police Association (FNCPA) was created to co-ordinate input from other police forces in dealing with Indigenous policing issues.

In January 2006, two Indigenous men burned to death and an officer was seriously injured in a rescue attempt at a Nishnawbe-Aski Police Service detachment that the police force couldn't afford to bring into compliance with the fire code.

In 2020, Prime Minister Justin Trudeau promised to review the First Nations and Inuit Policing Program in a throne speech. That review began in 2022, after the Canadian Human Rights Tribunal found that the federal government, which unilaterally sets the budgets for First Nations police forces participating in the First Nations and Inuit Policing Program, engaged in discrimination when it failed to provide adequate funding to the Mashteuiatsh Innu Nation's police force. Later that same year, the British Columbia Special Committee on Reforming the Police Act unanimously recommended that the First Nations and Inuit Policing Program be replaced with a "new legislative and funding framework, consistent with international and domestic policing best practices and standards," and noted that "a truly decolonized lens would see Indigenous police services as an option for neighbouring municipalities or regions."

List of Indigenous police forces
In 2010, there were 38 self-administered First Nation police services in Canada, with one service each in British Columbia, Saskatchewan, and Manitoba; three services in Alberta; nine in Ontario; and 23 in Quebec, although that number had decreased to 22 by 2020.

Alberta 
 Blood Tribe Police Service – Standoff, Alberta
 Lakeshore Regional Police, Driftpile, Alberta
 Tsuu T'ina Nation Police Service, Tsuu T'ina, Alberta

British Columbia 
 Stl’atl’imx Tribal Police Service – Lillooet, British Columbia and Mt. Currie, British Columbia

Manitoba 
 Manitoba First Nations Police – formerly Dakota Ojibway Police Service (Dakota Ojibway Tribal Council)  – Portage la Prairie, Manitoba

Ontario 

 First Nations Police

Quebec 
 Cree Police Service, Cree Regional Authority  – Montreal, Quebec
 Eeyou Eenou Police Force Headquarters – Chisasibi, Quebec
 Kanesatake Mohawk Police, Kanesatake, Quebec – No longer exists
 Nunavik Police Service – Kuujjuaq, Quebec
 Long Point Police – Winneway, Quebec
 Nasakapi Police Force – Kawawachikamach, Quebec
 Abenaki Police Force - Wolinak and Odanak Reserves, Quebec

Saskatchewan 
 File Hill First Nations Police Service – Balcarres, Saskatchewan

See also
 Aboriginal Combined Forces Special Enforcement Unit (A-CFSEU)

References

External links

 First Nations Chiefs of Police Association
 Aboriginal Policing Directorate -Public Safety and Emergency Preparedness Canada
 The Aboriginal Justice Implementation Commission – Manitoba
 UCCM Anishnaabe Police Service
 Policing and Corrections – Aboriginal Canada Portal
 Nishnawbe-Aski Police Service
 Blood Tribe Police
 Dakota Ojibway Tribal Council (DOTC) Police Department
 Stl'atl'imx Tribal Police Service